American rapper JID (also stylized J.I.D) has released three studio albums, three compilation albums, two extended plays (EP), four mixtapes and fifteen singles.

JID's debut studio album, The Never Story, was released on March 10, 2017. It peaked at number 197 on the US Billboard 200 chart. The album features guest appearances from 6lack, EarthGang and Mereba. The album's lead single, "Never", was released prior to the album. JID's lyrics details a narrative on his upbringing in East Atlanta.

On November 26, 2018, JID released his second studio album, DiCaprio 2. It serves as a sequel to his extended play DiCaprio released in 2015. The album was supported by two singles, "151 Rum" and "Off Deez" featuring J. Cole. The album features guest appearances from 6lack, ASAP Ferg, BJ the Chicago Kid, Ella Mai, J. Cole, Joey Badass and Method Man.

Albums

Studio albums

Mixtapes

Compilation albums

Collaborative albums

Extended plays

Singles

As lead artist

As featured artist

Other charted songs

Guest appearances

Music videos

As lead artist

As featured artist

Notes

References

Hip hop discographies
Discographies of American artists